Cambridge Library may refer to:

Cambridge University Library, the main library of Cambridge University, England
Cambridge Public Library, in Cambridge, Massachusetts
Cambridge Military Library, Halifax, Nova Scotia

See also
Libraries of the University of Cambridge